David Calvert Daughtry is an American gospel musician, actor, and worship leader at West Angeles Church of God in Christ, while he is an urban contemporary gospel and a traditional black gospel recording artist and singer. He started his solo music career, in 2014, with the studio album, David Daughtry, that was released by Entertainment One Music and Karew Records. The album charted on two Billboard magazine charts.

Early life
David Calvert Daughtry was born in Milwaukee, Wisconsin, where he started performing and understanding sheet music at six years-old. He is a worship leader at West Angeles Church of God in Christ.

Music career
His individual music recording career began in 2014, with the studio album, David Daughtry, that was released on September 9, 2014, from both Entertainment One Music and Karew Records. The album charted on two Billboard magazine charts, while it placed on the Gospel Albums and Heatseekers Albums, where it peaked at Nos. 12 and 28, correspondingly.

Acting career
He has appeared in the following movies: "Woman Thou Art Loosed", "Something New" & "First Sunday". He has also appeared in the following television shows: "The American Bible Challenge" & "Parenthood".

Discography

References

External links
 

Living people
African-American songwriters
African-American Christians
Musicians from Milwaukee
Musicians from Los Angeles
Songwriters from Wisconsin
Songwriters from California
MNRK Music Group artists
1975 births
21st-century African-American people
20th-century African-American people